Jack William Roberts (c. 1930 – April 14, 2013) was a Canadian football player who played for the Toronto Argonauts. He won the Grey Cup with them in 1952. He also attended and played football at the University of Toronto. He died in 2013.

References

1930s births
2013 deaths
Toronto Varsity Blues football players
Toronto Argonauts players
Canadian football people from Toronto
Players of Canadian football from Ontario